Cayne may refer to:

 James Cayne (1934-2021), American businessman, former CEO of Bear Stearns
 Candis Cayne (born 1971), American transgender actress
 Cayne (game), a 2017 free video game, prequel to Stasis